The Sabah FC 2022–23 season is Sabah's fifth Azerbaijan Premier League season, and their sixth season in existence.

Season events

On 25 May 2022, Sabah announced the signing of Tellur Mutallimov to a two-year contract from Sumgayit.

On 9 June, Anatoliy Nuriyev joined Sabah on a three-year contract from Kolos Kovalivka. Three days later, 12 June, Davit Volkovi joined from Zira on a two-year contract.

On 17 June, Namiq Alesgerov signed on a three-year contract from Bursaspor.

On 10 July, Spanish defender Jon Irazabal arrived from Amorebieta, signing a two-year contract. Five days later, 15 July, Abdoulaye Ba signed a one-year contract with Sabah, with the option of an additional year, from Arouca. Three days after that, 18 July, Emmanuel Apeh signed a two-year contract with Sabah from Tenerife.

On 29 December, Alyaksandr Nyachayew left Sabah after his contract was terminated by mutual agreement.

On 3 January, Abdulla Rzayev was recalled from his loan deal at Shamakhi, and joined Kapaz on loan for the remainder of the season, along with Idris Ingilabli.

On 28 January, Abdulla Khaybulayev was loaned to Samtredia until December 2023.

On 4 February, Higor Gabriel was loaned to Lviv until June 2023.

Squad

Transfers

In

Loans in

Loans out

Released

Friendlies

Competitions

Overview

Premier League

Results summary

Results by round

Results

League table

Azerbaijan Cup

Squad statistics

Appearances and goals

|-
|colspan="14"|Players away on loan:

|-
|colspan="14"|Players who left Sabah during the season:
|}

Goal scorers

Clean sheets

Disciplinary record

References

Sabah FC (Azerbaijan) seasons
Azerbaijani football clubs 2022–23 season